Siege of Seringapatam can refer to:

 Siege of Seringapatam (1792) during the Third Anglo-Mysore War
 Siege of Seringapatam (1799) during the Fourth Anglo-Mysore War